The Albion Mountains are a mountain range in the U.S. states of Idaho (~99%) and Utah (~1%), spanning Cassia County, Idaho and barely reaching into Box Elder County, Utah. Most of the mountains are part of the Albion Division of the Minidoka Ranger District of Sawtooth National Forest.

The Raft River Mountains are southeast of the range, while the Black Pine Mountains are to the east and the Snake River Plain to the north. The streams in the mountains are in the Snake River watershed, which is a tributary of the Columbia River. The towns of Almo, Elba, and Malta are east of the range, Albion, Burley, and Heyburn are to the north, and Oakley is to the west. There are six alpine lakes in the Albion Mountains. Lake Cleveland is north of Mount Harrison, a small unnamed lake is southeast of Mount Harrison, and the four Independence Lakes are north of Cache Peak.

Several roads and trails are located in the mountains, which provide for a variety of activities including hiking, off-road vehicle riding, fishing, and hunting. A paved road ascends to the summit of Mount Harrison. Most of the peaks can be accessed relatively easily via class one or two routes. City of Rocks National Reserve and Castle Rocks State Park are located in the southern portion of the range and is a popular destination for rock climbing. The Pomerelle ski area is located in the range and has two chairlifts.

Idaho's rarest plant, Christ's Indian Paintbrush is a plant endemic to the upper slopes of Mount Harrison, being found nowhere else in the world. Davis' springparsley is a plant that is also endemic to the Albion Mountains. The South Hills crossbill is a bird believed to be a separate species than the Common crossbill, and it is endemic to the Albion Mountains and the South Hills due to ecological speciation.

In February 1945 nine people died on Mount Harrison when a B-24 Liberator Army Bomber crashed during a training mission in dense fog.

Peaks

Gallery

See also

 List of mountains of Idaho
 List of mountain peaks of Idaho
 List of mountain ranges in Idaho

References

External links 
 U.S. Forest Service Sawtooth National Forest

Mountain ranges of Box Elder County, Utah
Landforms of Cassia County, Idaho
Mountain ranges of Idaho
Mountain ranges of Utah
Sawtooth National Forest